Fables is the second album by England Dan & John Ford Coley.

Track listing
All songs written by John Ford Coley and Dan Seals, except where noted.

Side one
 "Simone"
 "Casey"
 "Free The People"
 "What I'm Doing"

Side two
 "Carolina" (Kerry Chater, Roger Karshner)
 "Tomorrow"
 "Candles of Our Lives"
 "Matthew"
 "Stay by the River"

Personnel
 Dan Seals – lead vocals (1, 3-9), backing vocals, acoustic guitar
 John Ford Coley – lead vocals (2-9), backing vocals, acoustic guitar, acoustic piano (4)
 Louie Shelton – electric guitar (1, 3), bass guitar (3, 4), guitar (4, 5, 8), electric sitar (9)
 Larry Muhoberac – acoustic piano (1, 8), keyboards (2)
 Clarence McDonald – organ (3, 7), keyboards (5)
 Larry Knechtel – acoustic piano (6, 9)
 Don Randi – organ (8, 9)
 Reinie Press – bass guitar (1, 5, 7)
 Jack Conrad – bass guitar (2)
 Max Bennett – bass guitar (6, 8, 9)
 Russ Kunkel – drums (1, 2)
 Jim Gordon – drums (3, 4)
 Hal Blaine – drums (5, 7)
 Paul Humphrey – drums (6)
 John Guerin – drums (8, 9)
 Bobbye Hall Porter – percussion (8, 9)
 Marty Paich – string arrangements

References

1972 albums
England Dan & John Ford Coley albums
A&M Records albums
Albums recorded at A&M Studios